Koivumäki is a surname. Notable people with the surname include:

Eero Koivumäki (1924–2013), Finnish rower
Keijo Koivumäki (1926–2017), Finnish rower
Nina Koivumäki (born 1985), Finnish judoka

Finnish-language surnames